The Falls is an open-air shopping mall in Kendall, Florida.  The mall has 111 upscale stores. The mall's anchor store is Macy's. Bloomingdale's was an anchor at this mall, but closed on March 20, 2020. This mall also features a movie theater, which is called Regal Entertainment Group (United Artists Falls 12), and is currently managed and 50% owned by the Simon Property Group.

History
The Falls opened in 1980 as an upscale, open-air plaza.  As its name implies, the center is designed around a lushly-landscaped man-made lagoon featuring numerous pools, waterfalls and bridges accented with modern sculpture pieces and decorative lighting. In 1984 the first anchor store, Bloomingdale's, was added, bringing the center to 450,000 ft². Bloomingdale's closed their two-story store temporarily in September 1992 after the store was severely damaged by Hurricane Andrew, but it later re-opened in late 1993, as a three-story Bloomingdale’s. Macy's opened a store in 1996 during an expansion that doubled the size of the shopping center. The center features an iconic tower sign on the southwestern corner of South Dixie Highway and S.W. 136th Street (Howard Drive).  The success of the center has led to the surrounding Howard, Briar Bay and Colonial Palms neighborhoods to be encompassed by the generic "The Falls" name.

The center was sold in December 1997 to Taubman Centers, which transferred ownership in 1998 to the GM Pension Trust.  Taubman continued to manage the center until 2004, when the GM Pension Trust sold a half-interest in The Falls to The Mills Corporation, which also assumed management.  In 2007, Simon Property Group and Farallon Capital Management acquired The Mills and subsequently assumed management of The Falls.

On February 7, 2020, Bloomingdale’s parent company, Macy's, Inc., announced that they will close 125 locations across the country, including the Bloomingdale’s location at The Falls. This will leave Macy’s as the only anchor store at the mall, which is currently still open. Bloomingdale's closed permanently on March 20, 2020. It was demolished soon after for a new Lifetime Fitness Center.

References

External links
The Falls Official Website

Shopping malls in Miami-Dade County, Florida
Shopping malls established in 1980
Simon Property Group
Kendall, Florida